The Żołynia gas field in Poland was discovered in 1962. It began production in 1965 and produces natural gas. The total proven reserves of the Żołynia gas field are around 106 billion cubic feet (3×109m³).

References

Natural gas fields in Poland